Guyana is a sovereign state on the northern mainland of South America. It is, however, included in the Caribbean Region due to its strong cultural, historical, and political ties with the Caribbean Community (CARICOM). With , Guyana is the fourth-smallest country on mainland South America after Uruguay, Suriname and French Guiana. The main economic activities in Guyana are agriculture (production of rice and Demerara sugar), bauxite mining, gold mining, timber, shrimp fishing and minerals. Chronic problems include a shortage of skilled labour and a deficient infrastructure.

Notable firms 
This list includes notable companies with primary headquarters located in the country. The industry and sector follow the Industry Classification Benchmark taxonomy. Organizations which have ceased operations are included and noted as defunct.

References

 
Guyana